Charlottenlund Sportsklubb is a Norwegian sports club from Charlottenlund in Trondheim, Trøndelag, Norway. It has sections for association football and team handball.

It was established on 24 May 1945 as a merger of Charlottenlund IL, Charlottenlund AIL and SK Skjold. In 1953 it lacked a section for handball, but had sections for Nordic skiing, speed skating and track and field.

The men's football team currently plays in the Fourth Division, the fifth tier of Norwegian football. In 2009 it contested a playoff to win promotion to the Second Division, but lost to Kolstad.

The team handball part of the club has a team in First Division, the second tier of Norwegian handball.

References

 Official site 

Football clubs in Norway
Sport in Trondheim
Association football clubs established in 1945
Norwegian handball clubs
Defunct athletics clubs in Norway
1945 establishments in Norway
Multi-sport clubs in Norway